Kiss TV is a music television station located in Bucharest owned by Antenna Group .

History
At the beginning of 2014, Kiss TV was entirely taken over by the Greek media company Antenna Group, following the withdrawal of ProSiebenSat.1 Media, the old owner of Kiss TV from 2006 till 2013.

Fresh Top 40
Fresh Top 40 is the music chart presented by Kiss TV. The chart is weekly and is voted by viewers, on Kiss TV's site. Kiss TV begun producing the chart in late 2006. So far, the songs which spent the most weeks at number one are: "Disturbia", by Rihanna; "In and Out of Love", by Armin van Buuren; "Poker Face", by Lady Gaga; and "Amazing", by Inna. The current number-one single is "Locul Potrivit" by Guess Who.

The show was  closed in 2009, but started again in 2014. Now is hosted by Andreea Berghea, (Voice over).

Distribution
Satellite broadcasting via Intelsat 12 (45°E) stopped in June 2017 and was switched together with Prima TV to Intelsat 33e (60°E).

References

External links
 Official website

Television stations in Romania
Television channels and stations established in 2006
ANT1 Group